The formation of patterns in the growth of bacterial colonies has extensively been studied experimentally. Resulting morphologies appear to depend on the growth conditions. They include well known morphologies such as dense branched morphology (DBM) or diffusion-limited aggregation (DLA), but much complex patterns and temporal behaviour can be found.

A large number of studies on pattern formation in bacterial colonies have been performed in Bacillus subtilis and in Proteus mirabilis. Mathematical modeling of colony growth can reproduce the observed morphologies and the effect of environmental changes. Employed models include:

 Reaction–diffusion system
 Cellular automata

Colonies of Bacillus subtilis
Colonies of Bacillus subtilis on a Petri dish can grow under controlled conditions. By varying agar concentration (which permits the control of the hardness of the medium), and the nutrient concentration, the response of the colony to external stresses can be studied. The different morphologies appear in the following growth conditions:

High nutrients level, hard medium Eden-like growth 

High nutrients level, semi-soft hardness of medium Periodical growth forming concentric rings 

High nutrients level, soft medium homogeneous, disk-like growth 

Low nutrients level, hard medium DLA growth 

Low nutrients level, soft medium DBM growth 

A complete morphological diagram can then be drawn by varying growth conditions. 

These different morphologies can be obtained from a reaction-diffusion model. This kind of model is useful to assess which mechanisms are relevant for the different morphologies. The complete morphological diagram can be obtained by using  two fields, density of bacteria and nutrient concentration, and taking into account that bacteria can increase motility in response to adverse external conditions. That means that diffusion in the medium and the response of bacteria are the relevant factors in this particular case.

References
 Experiments on Bacillus subtilis by Matsushita et al.
 Reaction-diffusion model for Bacillus Subtilis.

External links
Some more images of patterns in bacterial growth can be found in:
http://www.genomenewsnetwork.org/articles/05_03/stress_art.shtml
http://star.tau.ac.il/~eshel/gallery.html

Bacteriology